The  is an electric multiple unit (EMU) train type operated by the private railway operator Tokyu Corporation since 2002 on many of its commuter lines in the Tokyo area of Japan.

Design
First introduced in 2002, the design is based on the JR East E231 series commuter train, also manufactured by Tokyu Car Corporation (now J-TREC) in Yokohama, from which all cars in this series would be produced.

All trains are equipped with interior LCD screens, displaying the station names, and automatic announcements in both Japanese and English. The 5000 series uses blue seat moquette fabric, while the 5050 and 5080 series have red seat moquette.

The design of the 5000 series was the basis for the later 6000 series and 7000 series train types.

Driver's cab
All sets use the same driver's cab, with a gray color, and a single 'T' shaped brake and throttle controller. There are four throttle steps, and seven brake steps. The speedometers are equipped with ATC. To the right of the speedometer is an information screen, showing the run type (local, express, etc.), and information of the individual cars. This touch screen computer can also control interior temperature and lights.

Variants
  5000 series: 10-car sets used on the Tokyu Den-en-toshi Line since May 2002
  5000 series: 8-car sets used on the Tokyu Toyoko Line
  5050 series: 8-car sets used on the Tokyu Toyoko Line
  5050-4000 series: 10-car sets used on Tokyu Toyoko Line inter-running services since September 2012
  5080 series: 6-car sets used on the Tokyu Meguro Line since March 2003
  Y500 series: 8-car sets used on Minatomirai Line/Tokyu Toyoko Line inter-running services since February 2004

5000 series

These are ten-car sets first introduced on the Den-en-toshi Line from May 2002. These sets are distinguished by a green stripe above the doors. The 5000 series is fitted with CS-ATC and Tobu ATS (TSP) in order to run through the Tokyo Metro Hanzomon Line, and onward over the Tobu Skytree Line to Tōbu-Dōbutsu-Kōen, Tobu Isesaki Line to Kuki, and Tobu Nikko Line to Minami-Kurihashi. These sets are based at Tokyu's Nagatsuta depot, and are powered by Hitachi motors with VVVF inverters.

Initially six sets (5101–5106) were built between 2002 and 2003. Set 5101 was the prototype set and has slightly different dimensions (it is  narrower than the other sets and has a slightly non-standard door spacing). Between 2005 and 2008, fourteen additional sets (5107–5117 and 5120–5122) were built with two six-door cars each (cars 5 and 8); sets 5117 and 5120–5122 were fully new built, while car 4 of sets 5107–5116 were surplus cars from sets 5102–5106, as two of their cars (5 and 8) were replaced with new six-door cars as well. Set 5122 never entered service on the Den-en-toshi Line. In early 2009, two additional sets (5118 and 5119) were built as 9-car sets (car 4 was missing, and cars 5 and 8 were six-door cars) but these also never entered into service.

Between 2009 and 2010, a third six-door car (car 4) was added to sets 5104–5117 and 5120 (total 15 sets): three cars were new built and 12 were taken from other sets (two cars each from sets 5102, 5103, 5118, 5119, 5121, and 5122). Of the 15 surplus four-door cars created, four were used to return sets 5102 and 5103 to fully four-door sets, six were inserted into sets 5118, 5119, 5121, and 5122, and the remaining five cars were used in 5050 series sets 5170–5172. Meanwhile, sets 5118, 5119, 5121, and 5122 were reformed as eight car sets and transferred to the Tōyoko Line. As mentioned earlier, nine-car sets 5118 and 5119 each had of their two six-door cars removed and replaced with two four-door surplus cars, and ten-car sets 5121 and 5122 each had two six-door cars replaced with a single four-door surplus car. In addition, a motored four-door car from each set was removed, and used in 5050 series sets 5169 and 5172–5174.

A total of 45 new four-door cars were built from December 2015 to replace the three six-door cars in sets 5104–5117 and 5120 to ensure uniform door-spacing ahead of the introduction of platform edge doors at Den-en-toshi Line stations from 2016. All six-door cars were replaced by the end of 2017. The new cars added incorporate a number of interior design improvements, including higher seat backs and headrests on some seats.

Operations

Formations
The sets are formed as follows.

Den-en-toshi Line set 5101

The M1 cars (5 and 9) are each fitted with two single-arm pantographs, and the M car (2) is fitted with one pantograph.

Den-en-toshi Line sets 5102 onward

The M1 cars (3 and 7) are each fitted with two single-arm pantographs, and the M car (9) is fitted with one pantograph.

Toyoko Line 8-car sets

The M1 cars (3 and 7) are each fitted with two single-arm pantographs.

Interior

Livery variations

All-over green 
Toyoko Line eight-car set 5122 received an all-over green vinyl wrapping livery in September 2017 to mark the 90th anniversary of the opening of the Toyoko Line and recreating the appearance of the original 5000 series EMUs nicknamed "green frog" which formerly operated on the line. It is scheduled to carry this livery until the end of August 2018.

100th anniversary 
From 10 April 2022, Toyoko Line 5050 series set 5151 received a special livery to commemorate the 100th anniversary of Tokyu Corporation's founding.

5050 series

These are eight-car sets introduced on the Toyoko Line from April 2004. These sets are distinguished by a pink stripe above the doors. They are similar to the 5000 series, the only difference being that they have eight cars, and that they have the pink stripe instead of green. They are based at Motosumiyoshi Depot, and are capable of running through the Minatomirai Line. The 5050 series is notable as being the first type of train in the world to feature full-color LED destination indicators.

Sets 5169–5174 each originally included one or two surplus 5000 series cars (5170–5172 had two surplus cars each, and the other sets had one); one car from sets 5169 and 5172–5174 were surplus motored cars with their pantographs and motored bogies temporarily removed, and were eventually replaced with new trailer cars while the motored cars were renumbered in the 4000 series.

Set 5155 was withdrawn in July 2017 following accident damage sustained in 2014, while set 5156 was transferred to Yokohama Minatomirai Railway in 2018 and renumbered Y517 to replace set Y516 damaged in the same accident. New build sets 5177 and 5178 were built in 2016 and 2019 respectively as replacement trains.

In 2020, set 5173 was reformed as a 10-car set and renumbered as set 4111. Furthermore, in 2022, set 5166 was reformed as a 10-car set and feature two Q-SEAT cars (numbered cars 4 and 5 within the set) in preparation of Q-SEAT service on the Toyoko Line. The set was renumbered to 4112. Following the completion of newly formed 4112, it was announced that three more sets (sets 5167-5169) will be reformed into 10-car trainsets for service on the Sotetsu-Tokyu Link. Once reformed, they will be numbered 4113-4115 respectively. The first "Q-Seat" cars entered service on the Toyoko Line on 24 October 2022; however full commencement of "Q-Seat" services will begin in February 2023.

Operations

Formation
Toyoko Line eight-car sets are formed as follows.

The M1 cars (3 and 7) are each fitted with two single-arm pantographs.

Interior

Sustina prototype car
J-TREC is testing a prototype car based on the sustina design, as part of a Toyoko Line 5050 series set. The car, numbered 5576, is part of set 5176.

5050-4000 series

New 5050-4000 series 10-car sets based on the 5050 series design were delivered from Tokyu Car from April 2011, entering service from September 2012 ahead of the start of Tokyu Toyoko Line and Tokyo Metro Fukutoshin Line inter-running services in March 2013.

Operations

Formations
The ten-car sets are formed as follows.

The M1 and M1' cars each have two single-arm pantographs, and the M car is fitted with one.

Cars 4601 to 4604 (included in sets 4101 to 4104 respectively) were renumbered from former 5050 series cars 5469, 5473, 5474, and 5472 (from sets 5169, 5173, 5174, and 5172 respectively), which were in turn from former Den-en-toshi Line 5000 series cars 5918, 5919, 5922, and 5921 (from sets 5118, 5119, 5122, and 5121 respectively); they are  narrower and retain their original blue moquette seating.

Interior

Shibuya Hikarie

Set number 4110 was delivered in April 2013 in a special Shibuya Hikarie body graphics and with modified interior to mark the first anniversary of Tokyu's "Shibuya Hikarie" development located above the newly expanded underground Shibuya Station. This trainset entered revenue service on 26 April 2013. It is the first 5050 series train to feature LED interior lighting, and has higher backed seating than regular trains, with grey seat backs in cars 1, 3, 8, and 10, brown seat backs in cars 2, 4, 6, and 9, and blue seat backs in cars 5 and 7. The train is equipped experimentally with free WiFi. One stanchion in the train features an embossed heart design as a whimsical way to brighten up commuters' journeys.

History

Nine cars of the first set were delivered from Tokyu Car's Yokohama factory to Tokyu's Nagatsuta Depot in Kanagawa Prefecture between 29 and 31 March 2011. These cars were formed into a 10-car set with the inclusion of intermediate motor car 4601, renumbered from former 5050 series trailer car 5469, which was itself previously renumbered from motor car 5918. The second 10-car set was delivered from Tokyu Car in June 2011.

Set 4101 entered revenue service on the Tokyu Toyoko Line from 9 September 2011, reduced to an 8-car formation.

From 10 September 2012, 10-car 5050-4000 series sets entered revenue service on the Seibu Ikebukuro Line (and Seibu Yurakucho Line) and Tobu Tojo Line, with inter-running through to the Tokyo Metro Fukutoshin Line and Tokyo Metro Yurakucho Line.

In July 2020, a former 8-car set built in 2010 (set 5173) was joined with two new cars (built in 2019) and reformed as 10-car set 4111.

In July 2022, another former 8-car set 5166 was reformed into 10-car set 4112 with two new “Q-Seat” cars in preparation for reserved seating service on the Toyoko Line in 2023. As of 1 August 2022, the new Q-Seat cars feature a livery very similar to those used on the Oimachi Line, however they are painted in red in contrast to orange. Two months later, three more sets (5167, 5168, and 5169) were announced to be lengthened into 10-car trainsets in preparation for through-running service on the Sotetsu line. Once completed, they will be renumbered to sets 4113, 4114, and 4115 respectively. The first "Q-Seat" cars entered service on the Toyoko Line on 24 October 2022; however full commencement of "Q-Seat" services will begin in February 2023.

5080 series

Ten six-car sets were introduced on the Meguro Line from March 2003. These sets are distinguished from the others by a dark blue stripe above the doors. Unlike the other variants, they are powered by Toshiba equipment, rather than Hitachi. The 5080 series is fitted with CS-ATC, ATO and TASC for use on the Tokyo Metro Namboku Line, Saitama Rapid Railway Line, and Toei Mita Line. These sets are based at Motosumiyoshi Depot.

Two additional cars are expected to be inserted into each set for the introduction of through services to the Sōtetsu Shin-Yokohama Line. The first ten of these new cars, of which two are former 6000 series cars, were delivered in October 2021.  all sets have been lengthened to eight cars.

Operations

Formation
Meguro Line six-car sets are formed as follows, with three motored (M) cars and three trailer (T) cars. Car 1 is at the Meguro end.

The M1 cars (5) are fitted with two single-arm pantographs, and the M cars (2) are fitted with one.

New Eight Car Formation
In preparation of service on the new Sotetsu-Tokyu Link, all six-car sets will be lengthened to eight-car sets before spring of 2023. Cars 1 and 8 feature “8-Cars” stickers to distigush them from six car trainsets. They are formed as follows, with four motored (M) cars and four trailer (T) cars. Car 1 is at the Meguro end.

The M1 cars (7) are fitted with two single-arm pantographs, and the M cars (2) and (4) are fitted with one.

Interior

Y500 series

These eight-car sets are owned by the Yokohama Minatomirai Railway and are used for interrunning services over the Tokyu Toyoko Line and Minatomirai Line. The fleet of six eight-car sets entered service in February 2004.

Set Y516 was withdrawn in 2017 following accident damaged sustained in 2014, and a replacement set (Y517, former Tokyu 5050 series set 5156) was transferred in 2018.

Operations

Formation
Yokohama Minatomirai Railway Y500 series sets are formed as follows.

The M1 cars (3 and 7) are each fitted with two single-arm pantographs.

Interior

References

External links

 Tokyu EMU details 
 Tokyu 5000 series (Japan Railfan Magazine Online) 
 Tokyu 5050 series (Japan Railfan Magazine Online) 
 Tokyu 5080 series (Japan Railfan Magazine Online) 
 Minato Mirai Y500 series (Japan Railfan Magazine Online) 

Electric multiple units of Japan
5000 series
Train-related introductions in 2002
Tokyu Car multiple units
J-TREC multiple units
1500 V DC multiple units of Japan